KJSN (102.3 FM) is a commercial radio station in Modesto, California, known as "Sunny 102.3."  It is owned by iHeartMedia, Inc., and broadcasts an adult contemporary radio format, switching to Christmas music for much of November and December.  The radio studios are on Lancey Drive in Modesto.  The transmitter is on Fine Avenue near Floyd Avenue in Modesto.

KJSN is Modesto's affiliate for the call-in and request show Delilah, syndicated by co-owned Premiere Networks and aired in the evening.  It also carries John Tesh, Intelligence for Your Life, syndicated by Compass Media Networks on weekday afternoons.

History
The station first signed on as KFIV-FM on July 4, 1977, with a Top 40 format. This was the station that was "portrayed" in the George Lucas film American Graffiti, where Wolfman Jack was supposedly broadcasting from.  It was a very popular station in Modesto and was part of youth culture there, until its change to an adult contemporary format in late 1988. In 1989, the station became its present KJSN.

References

External links

JSN
Modesto, California
Mass media in Stanislaus County, California
Radio stations established in 1977
1977 establishments in California
IHeartMedia radio stations